Mount Wilis is a solitary volcanic massif surrounded by low-elevation plains. It is located in Java island, Indonesia. No confirmed historical eruptions are known from this volcano.

Images gallery

See also

 List of volcanoes in Indonesia

References

Stratovolcanoes of Indonesia
Volcanoes of East Java
Landforms of East Java
Pleistocene stratovolcanoes